Lesbian, gay, bisexual, transgender (LGBT) people in Saudi Arabia face severe repression and legal challenges not experienced by non-LGBT residents. Both male and female same-sex sexual activity is illegal. 

LGBT rights are not recognized by the government of Saudi Arabia. The criminal code of Saudi Arabia is derived from the Islamic Sharia, from the 7th-century Quran and the prophetic teachings of Lut and Muhammad which have been meticulously preserved in the Sunnah. Homosexuality and being transgender are widely seen as immoral and indecent activities, and the law punishes acts of homosexuality with capital punishment, up to life imprisonment, fines, deportation and flogging; "chemical castration" has been used. Beatings and torture have been applied during investigation and detentions. Community violence against LGBT persons occurs.

Legality of same-sex sexual acts

Criminal laws

Saudi Arabia has no criminal code. The primary source of law in Saudi Arabia is the Islamic Sharia. This is derived from the Quran and the traditions of Lut & Muhammad contained in the Sunnah; ijma, or scholarly consensus on the meaning of the Quran and the Sunnah developed after Muhammad's death; and Qiyas, or analogical reasoning applied to the principles of the Quran, Sunnah and ijma. Judges apply their personal interpretation of Sharia to any particular case (Ijtihad) and are not bound by any previous decisions, sometimes resulting in divergent judgements even in apparently identical cases. In addition, royal decrees and government regulations have been issued. Reformers have often called for codified laws to be instituted, and there appears to be a trend in the country to codify, publish and even translate some Saudi criminal and civil laws. However, the traditional interpretation of Sharia is that it prohibits homosexual acts (as zina or unlawful sexual intercourse) and, specifically, liwat or sodomy, though there is a difference of opinion on the punishment ranging from none at all (hanafi) to the death penalty.

In 1928, the Saudi judicial board advised Islamic judges to look for guidance in two books by the Hanbalite jurist Marʿī ibn Yūsuf al-Karmī al-Maqdisī (d.1033/1624). Liwat (sodomy) is to be

treated like fornication, and must be punished in the same manner. If muḥṣan [commonly translated as "adulterer" but technically meaning someone who has had legal intercourse, but who may or may not currently be married] and free [not a slave], one must be stoned to death, while a free bachelor must be punished with 100 lashes and banished for a year.

Sodomy is proven either by the perpetrator confessing four times or by the testimony of four trustworthy Muslim men, who were eyewitnesses to the act. If there are fewer than four witnesses, or if one is not upstanding, then they are all to be chastised with 80 lashes for slander.

In the 1980s, Saudi King Khaled issued numerous royal decrees designed to secure support among religious fundamentalists in the aftermath of an uprising of religious extremists in 1979, known as the Grand Mosque seizure.

The "Rules of Apprehension, Temporary Custody & Precautionary Detention Regulation" codified the criminal code on homosexuality by listing it among the crimes that warranted arrest and detention. In addition to law enforcement, a second royal decree formally established the Committee for the Promotion of Virtue and the Prevention of Vice (CPVPV) and gave this committee the power to arrest and detain people who violate the traditional teaches of Islam, including acts of homosexuality and cross-dressing.

Combating homosexuality remains one of the major goals of the CPVPV, along with its campaign against the consumption of alcohol and the practice of magic.

In September 2013, it was announced that all Gulf Cooperative Countries had agreed to discuss a proposal to establish some form of, yet unknown, testing in order to ban gay foreigners from entering any of the countries. However, it has been suggested that concern regarding the hosting of the 2022 FIFA World Cup by Qatar, and fears for the inevitable worldwide controversy if it is decided that football fans will have to be screened for homosexuality, made officials backtrack the plans and insist that it was a mere proposal.

Criminal procedure

Cases

In 2000, the Saudi Government reported that it had sentenced nine Saudi men to extensive prison terms with lashing for engaging in cross-dressing and homosexual relations. That same year the government executed three Yemeni male workers for homosexuality and child molestation.

In 2001, Saudi teacher and playwright Muhammad Al-Suhaimi was charged with promoting homosexuality and after a trial was sentenced to prison. In 2006, he was given a pardon and allowed to resume teaching.

In May 2005, the government arrested 92 men for homosexuality, who were given sentences ranging from fines to prison sentences of several months and lashings. Likewise, on 7 November 2005 Riyadh police raided what the Saudi press called a "beauty contest for gay men" at Al-Qatif. What became of the five men arrested for organizing the event is not known.

Persons caught living in the kingdom illegally are often accused of other crimes, involving illegal drugs, pornography, prostitution and homosexuality. Several such police crackdowns were reported in 2004–2005. A similar raid in 2008 netted Filipino workers arrested on charges of alcohol and gay prostitution. The Arab News newspaper article on the arrests stated, "Gay rights are not recognized in the Middle East countries and the publication of any material promoting them is banned".

International protests from human rights organizations prompted some Saudi officials within the Saudi Arabian embassy in Washington, D.C., to imply that their kingdom will only use the death penalty when someone has been convicted of child molestation, rape, sexual assault, murder or engaging in anything deemed to be a form of political advocacy.

In 2010, Prince Saud bin Abdulaziz bin Nasir al Saud was found guilty at the Old Bailey in London of murdering his servant Bandar Abdulaziz in their suite at the Landmark Hotel in London. During the trial, it was alleged that the prince had received a "sexual massage" before the murder, and that he and Abdulaziz had been in a sexual relationship. According to the prosecutor, the Prince sexually and physically abused his servant as well as paid other men for sexual services. He was sentenced to life imprisonment. In March 2013, he was allowed to return to Saudi Arabia to serve the remainder of his term in a Saudi prison. According to the agreement between the U.K. and Saudi Arabia, he must serve at least 20 years before he can be released.

In 2011–2012, the Saudi newspaper Okaz announced that the government had arrested over 260 people for the crime of homosexuality over a one-year period. According to the official report, the men were caught cross-dressing, wearing ladies' makeup and trying to pick up other men.

A gay Saudi diplomat named Ali Ahmad Asseri applied for asylum in the United States after he claimed the Saudi government discovered his sexuality and also because of dissent.

In 2014, a 24-year-old Saudi Arabian man was sentenced to three years' detention and 450 lashes after a Medina court found him guilty of "promoting the vice and practice of homosexuality", after he was caught using Twitter to arrange dates with other men.

On 13 October 2019, Saudi authorities arrested a 23-year-old national, Suhail al-Jameel, for posting a picture in of him wearing short shorts at the beach. He is a gay social media personality in Saudi Arabia, who openly documented his sexuality on Snapchat and Twitter. Al-Jameel wrote on Snapchat that he was arrested on the charges of sharing nudity online. Soon after fans started using a #freesuhail hashtag on Twitter.

On 28 July 2020, a Saudi court sentenced Mohamad al-Bokari, a Yemeni blogger, to 10 months in prison, a fine of 10,000 riyals ($2,600) and deportation for a Twitter post supporting equal rights for people in same-sex relationships.

Recognition of same-sex relationships

This country does not recognise, allow, or perform same-sex marriage, domestic partnerships, or civil unions.

Gender identity

The Saudi government views cross-dressing and being transgender as being prohibited and is therefore illegal. Criminal sanctions for cross-dressing tend to be the same for homosexuality, i.e. whippings, fines, imprisonment, capital punishment, and, for foreigners, deportation.

The Saudi government does not permit sex change operations to take place in the kingdom, and it does not allow people to obtain new legal documents to have their gender changed on their documents.

In 2017, two transgender Pakistanis were allegedly "packed in sacks, thrashed with sticks and tortured to death" by Saudi police. A statement from the Saudi Interior Ministry, however, said the reports were "totally wrong and nobody was tortured".

People with a transsexual or transgender identity card are not allowed to make the pilgrimage to Mecca.

Living conditions

Discrimination and harassment
Saudi Arabia has laws against discrimination on the basis of gender but not sexual orientation. Harassment or violence against LGBT people is not addressed in any bias-motivated or hate crime law. Advocacy for LGBT rights is illegal within the kingdom.
The required exit and entry visa paperwork does not ask people about their sexual orientation, as it does their nationality, sex, religion and marital status. In 2011, Mirel Radoi, a Romanian football player who plays for the Saudi Alhilal Club, was fined 20,000 Saudi Riyals and suspended for two matches after calling a Saudi Arabian football player, Hussein Abdul Ghani, who plays for Nasr Club, gay. The public comment, intended as an insult, was highly controversial and generated quite a bit of coverage in the Saudi press, including the refusal of Hussein Abdul Ghani to shake hands with Mirel Radoi after a later game.

Education
Public education in Saudi Arabia is required to teach basic Islamic values based on the interpretation of the Quran, which includes a strong condemnation of homosexuality. In addition, Islam condemns cross-dressing. The Ministry of Education approved textbooks that reflect the country's Islamic and cultural view against homosexual acts by stating that "homosexuality is one of the most disgusting sins and greatest crimes", and that the proper punishment for the intentional act of homosexual intercourse in public is capital punishment. However, in 2020 the Ministry of Education was found to have removed the condemnation of homosexuality as something punishable by death from textbooks.

In 2012, the Saudi government asked the CPVPV to assist in the expulsion of students who were judged, by their mannerisms and taste in fashion, to be gay or lesbian.

Private schools exist in Saudi Arabia, mainly to serve the needs of expatriates with children, and they are generally allowed more discretion in setting up their own school curriculum and policies. Unless a majority of the expatriate families are Muslim, the private school is likely to only teach the basic beliefs of Islam, through lessons about the culture, language and history of Saudi Arabia. Textbook content or policies regarding homosexuality or cross-dressing tends to be influenced by the prevailing attitudes of the expatriates and their country of origin.

Censorship 

The Saudi government censors the media with fines, imprisonment and, for foreigners, deportation for any person possessing, importing, distributing or producing media without governmental approval. Media content, including advertising, cannot be seen as insulting the royal family or conflicting with Islamic teachings and values.

Homosexuality and cross-dressing are dealt with in print news through news coverage of criminal matters, the HIV/AIDS pandemic or allusions to perceived Western decadence. No endorsement of LGBT rights is permitted.

Radio and TV programs are similarly banned from expressing support for LGBT rights, but homosexuality and cross-dressing can be discussed as long as the negative attitudes and biases are reinforced. A call-in TV show may feature a discussion about the immorality or "illness" of homosexuality, or, as in the case of Mirel Radoi, coverage may focus on a celebrity, in this case a Romanian-born football player, implying, as a false insult, that another football player was gay.

The government does allow public movie theaters to exist, since 2018, but the films are censored, as are the DVDs purchased in many retail stores. LGBT themes are generally one of the themes edited out of movies. Customs agents keep a list of films or TV shows that are not allowed to be brought into the kingdom.

Government regulation of the Internet generally falls under the Royal Decrees on Anti-Cyber Crime (2007). Article 6 prohibits creating, distributing or accessing online content or webpages that the government deems to be pornographic or in violation of religious values or public morals or is a threat to public health, safety or order.

The Saudi government has frequently blocked Internet users in the kingdom from accessing web pages or other online content that express support for LGBT rights. The restrictions on the Internet extend to blogs, social media and video upload webpages.

In 2010, a 27-year-old Saudi man was charged with homosexuality and impersonating a police officer when he posted a comical video of himself online, where he discusses popular culture, shows off his chest hair and flirts with the camera man. He was sentenced to a year in prison, with 1,000 lashes, and ordered to pay a fine of 5,000 rials (US$1,333).

On 8 April 2020, Mohamad al-Bokari, a Yemeni blogger and activist was arrested in Saudi Arabia for posting a video on social media talking about equal rights for LGBTQ people. Human Rights Watch (HRW) urged the Saudi authorities to release the blogger immediately. HRW reviewed the video, where the activist responded to the social media queries, he said "Everyone has rights and should be able to practice them freely, including gay people".

In a crackdown across stores in the Saudi capital, Riyadh, according to the Saudi state-run TV channel al-Ekhbariya, government officials seized rainbow-colored clothing, products, toys, etc. The officials claimed that the June 2022 move was aimed at curbing the direct and indirect promotion of homosexuality in the country. An unnamed official from the Ministry of Commerce claimed that they were looking out for "slogans that violate the rules of Islam and public morals like promoting homosexuality colors, targeting the young generation." The items seized in the crackdown included hair accessories for children, backpacks, pencil cases, and rainbow stripes featured on crayon packs. When asked for comments from the Saudi authorities, none were received. In December 2022, authorities in neighboring Qatar carried out a similar purge.

Clubs and associations
Clubs, charities and political associations require permission from the government to exist, which will not be given to any organization that supports LGBT rights or even seeks to act as a social club for the LGBT community.

HIV/AIDS

No program exists within the Kingdom to stop the spread of HIV-AIDS among LGBT people. By law, all Saudi citizens who are infected with HIV or AIDS are entitled to free medical care, protection of their privacy and employment opportunities. The government has produced educational material on how the disease is spread  since the 1980s. Abdullah al-Hokail, a Saudi doctor who specializes in the pandemic, has been allowed to air public service announcements on television about the disease and how it is spread. Yet, ignorance, fear and prejudice are often directed at people living with the disease. While the government has designated several hospitals to treat those people infected with AIDS or HIV, other hospitals often refuse to care for such people or fail to treat them in a compassionate and humane manner. Hospitals and schools are often reluctant to distribute government information about the disease because of strong taboos and the stigma attached to how the virus can be spread. For example, condoms are legal, but until recently, they were rarely available anywhere other than certain hospitals or medical supply stores.

1990s
In the late 1990s, the Saudi government began to slowly step up a public education campaign about AIDS-HIV. It started to recognize World AIDS Day, and the Arabic and English daily newspapers were permitted to run articles and opinions that expressed the need for more education about the disease and more compassion for those people infected. The number of people living in the kingdom who were infected was a closely guarded secret, as the official policy was often that the disease was not a serious problem in a kingdom because Saudis followed the principles of traditional Islamic morality.

2003
In 2003, the government announced that it knew of 6,787 cases, and in 2004 the official number rose to 7,808. The government statistics claim that most of the registered cases are foreign males who contracted the disease through "forbidden" sexual relations.

2006
In June 2006, the Ministry of Health publicly admitted that more than 10,000 Saudi citizens were either infected with HIV or had AIDS. In December 2006, the Arab News ran an editorial that called for greater public awareness of how the virus is spread and more compassion for those people infected. In the same year, a Saudi citizen named Rami al-Harithi revealed that he had become infected with HIV while having surgery and has become an official proponent of education and showing compassion to those people infected. Saudi Princess Alia bint Abdullah has been involved in the Saudi AIDS Society, which was permitted in December 2006 to hold a public charity art auction followed by a discussion on how the disease was impacting the kingdom that included two Saudis living with HIV. The event was organized with the help of the Saudi National Program for Combating AIDS which is chaired by Dr. Sana Filimban.

2007
In January 2007, a Saudi economics professor at King Abdul Aziz University was permitted to conduct of survey of a handful of Saudi University students on their level of education about the pandemic. While much of the work on AIDS-HIV education has been supported by members of the Saudi royal family or medical doctors, there is an attempt to gain permission to create some independent AIDS societies, one of which is called Al-Husna Society, that would work on helping people infected with the disease find employment, education families and work to fight the prejudice that faces people infected. In 2007, a government-funded organization, the National Society for Human Rights, published a document suggesting ways to improve the treatment of people living with the disease. The proposed "Bill of Rights" document was criticized by Human Rights Watch for allegedly undermining human rights and global efforts to fight the pandemic.

Foreigners and HIV/AIDS
Foreigners who are applying for a work visa are required to demonstrate that they are not infected with the virus before they can enter the country, and are required to get a test upon arrival at a government accredited lab. To be issued their first work permit, they are also required to perform the test again before the renewal of a residency or work permit. Any foreigner that is discovered to be infected will be deported to the country of origin as soon as they are deemed fit to travel.

Summary table

See also

 Human rights in Saudi Arabia
 LGBT in Islam
 LGBT rights in the Middle East
 Capital punishment for homosexuality

References

Saudi Arabia
Politics of Saudi Arabia
LGBT in Saudi Arabia
Saudi Arabia
Human rights in Saudi Arabia
Saudi Arabia
Persecution of LGBT people